Josh Sewell (born July 26, 1981) is a former American football center and interior offensive lineman.

High school
Sewell was part of a Lincoln Southeast High School football team that took consecutive state titles in 1997 and 1998, playing both defense (nose tackle) and offense (offensive guard) while earning all-city and all-state honors to accompany his Class A heavyweight powerlifting championship.

College
Sewell committed to Indiana State, redshirting for his freshman season of 1999, and ultimately played only one season, 2000, before transferring to the University of Nebraska and sitting out the 2001 season in compliance of NCAA transfer eligibility rules.  He resumed in 2002 as a junior, playing in five games as a reserve center.  A productive senior season saw Sewell start all 13 Cornhusker games and earn honorable mention All-Big 12 and second-team academic All-Big 12 honors.

Professional
After being selected in the 6th round, 190th overall, by the Denver Broncos in the 2004 NFL Draft, Sewell was released on September 5, 2004 and re-signed to the practice squad the following day.

He inexplicably retired during mini-camp in 2005, and did not resurface until his selection in the 10th round of the 2007 NFL Europa Free Agent Draft by the Frankfurt Galaxy, then coached by Mike Jones.  In the inaugural All American Football League Draft in 2008, Team Alabama, led by head coach Jones, selected Sewell with their first pick, the 6th overall in the first round.

External links
 http://www.huskers.com/ViewArticle.dbml?SPSID=251&SPID=22&DB_OEM_ID=100&ATCLID=888

1981 births
Living people
Sportspeople from Lincoln, Nebraska
American football centers
Nebraska Cornhuskers football players
Frankfurt Galaxy players